Acylita is a genus of moths of the family Noctuidae erected by George Hampson in 1908.

Species
Acylita cara Schaus, 1894
Acylita distincta E. D. Jones, 1908
Acylita dukinfieldi Schaus, 1894
Acylita elongata Schaus, 1906
Acylita monosticta E. D. Jones, 1908
Acylita sanguifusa E. D. Jones, 1908

References

Hadeninae
Noctuoidea genera